Viola is a hamlet and census-designated place in the town of Ramapo, Rockland County, New York, United States. It is located north of Airmont, east of Montebello, south of Wesley Hills, and west of Hillcrest. The population was 6,868 at the 2010 census.

History

Alms House

The Alms House (or County Poor House) was established in 1837, at Viola (then known as Mechanicsville) in the town of Ramapo, for the poor and destitute (debtors). Rockland County had purchased the  parsonage farm of the Kakiat (West New Hempstead) Dutch Reformed Church (also known as the Brick Church) for use as an alms house. There the county originally built a wooden frame house to serve the poor. The inmates contributed to their upkeep by tending the farm. In 1883, a brick building was constructed. The facility included a school for the children. In 1957, the Alms House was moved to Building "C" at the Pomona Health Center in Summit Park, and the property would become the site of Rockland Community College. The Alms House was renamed the Rockland County Infirmary and Home. In 1977, it was removed to Building "A". It has been renamed the Summit Park Nursing Care Center.  
The old brick Alms House building remains as an administration building (Daniel T. Brucker Hall), used by Rockland Community College.  The farm lands are the campus.  The Poor Cemetery (Potter's Field) remains on the RCC campus, along with the original Gary Onderdonk Veterans' Cemetery.

Geography
Viola is located at  (41.126295, -74.083285).

Demographics

As of the census of 2000, there were 5,931 people, 1,681 households, and 1,250 families residing in the CDP. The population density was 2,192.4 per square mile (845.0/km2). There were 1,738 housing units at an average density of 642.4/sq mi (247.6/km2). The racial makeup of the CDP was 97.81% White, 0.32% African American, 0.05% Native American, 0.67% Asian, 0.07% Pacific Islander, 0.46% from other races, and 0.62% from two or more races. Hispanic or Latino of any race were 2.61% of the population.

There were 1,681 households, out of which 40.7% had children under the age of 18 living with them, 68.7% were married couples living together, 4.1% had a female householder with no husband present, and 25.6% were non-families. 24.4% of all households were made up of individuals, and 20.6% had someone living alone who was 65 years of age or older. The average household size was 3.53 and the average family size was 4.34.

In the CDP, the population was spread out, with 39.9% under the age of 18, 8.3% from 18 to 24, 17.6% from 25 to 44, 18.9% from 45 to 64, and 15.3% who were 65 years of age or older. The median age was 28 years. For every 100 females, there were 92.4 males. For every 100 females age 18 and over, there were 87.2 males.

The median income for a household in the CDP was $59,821, and the median income for a family was $87,273. Males had a median income of $68,533 versus $39,375 for females. The per capita income for the CDP was $27,289. About 4.9% of families and 6.5% of the population were below the poverty line, including 6.3% of those under age 18 and 9.6% of those age 65 or over.

Education
East Ramapo Central School District and Suffern Central School District (formerly Ramapo Central) serve portions of Viola.

References

Census-designated places in New York (state)
Hamlets in New York (state)
Census-designated places in Rockland County, New York
Hamlets in Rockland County, New York